Pia Conde  (born 18 April 1970) is a Swedish journalist and television presenter at SVT.

She started her career at TV4 hosting the daily news broadcast TV4Nyheterna, and later the Sunday breakfast television programme Söndagsmorgon.

After the switch to SVT, she has mainly hosted news broadcasts ABC, Rapport, Aktuellt and the business news programme A-ekonomi. Conde has also co-hosted and participated in lighter entertainment and game shows such as På spåret, the aid gala Världens barn, Allsång på Skansen and a television series about motor vehicles called Motoristen.

Personal life
She grew up in Sweden with a white mother from Finland and an Afro-Cuban father.

Pia Conde lives with Fredrik Sarman, attorney at law. He is also a Swede of Afro-Latino descent.

References

1970 births
Living people
Swedish television journalists
Swedish people of Finnish descent
Swedish people of Cuban descent